National colours are frequently part of a country's set of national symbols. Many states and nations have formally adopted a set of colours as their official "national colours" while others have de facto national colours that have become well known through popular use. National colours often appear on a variety of different media, from the nation's flag to the colours used in sports. Before World War I, they also served as the colors of different military uniforms for each nation.

Africa

North America

Sub-national colours

South America

Asia

Sub-national colours

Europe

Sub-national colours

Oceania

Sub-national colours

Countries with limited or no recognition 
These are the national colours for countries or states that have limited or no recognition.

Former countries

Caliphates

Ancient/Imperial Chinese dynasties

Supranational organisations 
Some noted supranational organisations like the United Nations and the European Union have their own colours as part of their branding and marketing. They are usually taken from the organisation's flag. Although they do not have national sporting teams, the colours can be used for anything connected to the organisation, like associated bodies.

Examples of use of these colours
 United Nations: the recognisable blue helmets of the peacekeeping operations and the flags of associated UN agencies like the World Health Organisation, with the UN's light blue and white. 
 European Union: the blue and yellow of the EU flag; uses include the blue European Health Insurance Card and the Blue Card for skilled immigration.

See also
 Tricolour
 List of international auto racing colours
 Lists of national symbols

References 

National colours
Color in culture